Mansoor Hussain Khan is an Indian film director and producer known for his works in Hindi cinema.

Early and personal life 
He is the son of film-maker Nasir Hussain. Khan attended IIT Bombay, Cornell University, and MIT before making his foray into Hindi cinema.

Khan is settled in Coonoor, Tamil Nadu with his wife Tina, where he indulges in farming. Their children are daughter Zayn and son Pablo.

Film career 
Khan made his directorial debut with the super-hit Qayamat Se Qayamat Tak (1988), for which Khan received the National Film Award for Best Popular Film Providing Wholesome Entertainment, and the Filmfare Award for Best Director for that year. Mansoor Khan's directorial debut paved the way back for the musical romantic genre in Hindi Cinema.

He followed this success four years later with Jo Jeeta Wohi Sikander (1992). Mansoor Khan's last two films; Akele Hum Akele Tum (1995) and Josh (2000) were moderately successful.  In 2008, he made a comeback, albeit as a producer, and has co-produced the movie Jaane Tu... Ya Jaane Na along with Aamir Khan, which marked the debut of his nephew Imran Khan.

Filmography

Non Film work 
He has launched a book, "The Third Curve" (2013), which talks about the world economy. He talks about unsustainable cities and society's false understanding of money in his book.

Awards 
National Film Awards
 National Film Award for Best Popular Film Providing Wholesome Entertainment (director) - Qayamat Se Qayamat Tak (1988)

Filmfare Awards
 Filmfare Award for Best Director -  Qayamat Se Qayamat Tak (1988)

References

External links 
 

20th-century Indian film directors
Indian male screenwriters
Hindi-language film directors
Filmfare Awards winners
Film directors from Hyderabad, India
Living people
Indian Muslims
21st-century Indian film directors
Film producers from Hyderabad, India
People from Coonoor
Directors who won the Best Popular Film Providing Wholesome Entertainment National Film Award
IIT Bombay alumni
Year of birth missing (living people)